Jefferson County Board of Education may refer to a U.S. public school board in several states, including:

Jefferson County Board of Education (Alabama)
Jefferson County Board of Education (Kentucky)

See also
 Jefferson County Public Schools (disambiguation)